The Big West men's soccer tournament is the conference championship tournament in soccer for the Big West Conference.  The tournament has been held every year since 2008. It is a single-elimination tournament and seeding is based on regular season records. The winner, declared conference champion, receives the conference's automatic bid to the NCAA Division I men's soccer championship.

Champions

Key

Finals

Performance by school

Most championships

References

External links